Matthieu Rosset (born 26 May 1990 in Lyon) is a French diver. He competed in the 3 m springboard event at the 2012 and 2016 Summer Olympics. He has won a gold medal (2012 3 m springboard) and three bronze medals (1 m springboard and 3m synchronized springboard in 2011 and 1 m springboard in 2012) at the European Championships.

In 2017, Rosset won the gold medal at the World Aquatics Championships with his partner Laura Marino in the team event with a total of 406.40 points.

References

1990 births
Living people
French male divers
Divers at the 2012 Summer Olympics
Divers at the 2016 Summer Olympics
Olympic divers of France
Sportspeople from Lyon
World Aquatics Championships medalists in diving
Male high divers
Divers at the 2020 Summer Olympics
20th-century French people
21st-century French people